Associated Church Press (aka "ACP", founded in 1916) is a professional membership organization brought together by a common commitment to excellence in journalism as a means to describe, reflect, and support the life of faith and the Christian community. Among its purposes are:

– to provide mutual support and encouragement, fostered by personal and professional relationships;

– to promote higher standards of communication through professional growth opportunities and recognition of excellence;

– to join in interfaith and public discourse with those who seek to build a more just society for all God’s people.

It organizes conferences, makes awards, organizes professional development opportunities, and provides postal advocacy and other resources for religious periodicals. Its Executive Director since 2017 is Gregg Brekke.

History 
The Associated Church Press traces its origin to a Saint Louis, Mo., meeting in 1916. Editors covering the quadrennial meeting of the Federal Council of Churches (now the National Council of Churches of Christ in the U.S.A.) decided that they should meet on a continuing basis.

Wartime constraints in 1917 and 1918 prevented meetings those two years. The second meeting was convened in Cleveland, Ohio, in June 1919. E. C. Wareing, Western Christian Advocate, was elected president of the then-named Editorial Council of the Religious Press. Jaspar T. Moses, National Bulletin, and F. M. Barton, The Expositor, were chosen secretary and treasurer, respectively.

In 1937, the name of the organization was changed to the Associated Church Press, and the constitution was revised. In 1947, a new constitution was adopted based on the recommendations of a special study committee headed by William B. Lipphard, Missions Magazine. Under the provisions of that constitution, membership in the Associated Church Press was extended to publications rather than to individual editors. However, provision for individual associate membership was made.

The constitution has been revised periodically; the current edition appears below as bylaws. The “Statement of Ethics and Standards of Professional Practice,” which appears below, was adopted by the Boston convention in April 1983.The Associated Church Press cooperates in educational and postal matters with religious press associations in the United States and Canada. It is also a corporate member of the World Association of Christian Communication, London, England.

Leadership 
The ACP is governed by a board of directors. Its current board members are:

President: Celeste Kennel-Shank

Individual Member

Vice President: John Thomas III

The Christian Recorder

Past President: Stephen Chavez

Retired, Adventist Review / Adventist World

Treasurer: Kevin Shanley

Individual Member

OTHER DIRECTORS:

Jocelyn Bell

Broadview

Sally Hicks 

Faith & Leadership, Duke University

Randy Hobson 

PCUSA.org

Meagan Clark

Religion Unplugged / The Media Project

See also
 Anglican Journal
 The Catholic Sun
 Peter Morton Day
 The Living Church
 Living Lutheran
 B. J. Stiles
 Touchstone (magazine)

External links
Official website

Christian publishing companies
Organizations established in 1916